Total Eclipse  is a  web television series streamed on the Brat network.  The series premiered on April 5, 2018

Plot
At Millwood high, Cassie and her band together to confront mean girls, boy drama, and their high school woes. But when reality becomes too much, they can always escape to their fantasy worlds.

Cast
Johnny Orlando as Sam
Mackenzie Ziegler as Cassie
Emily Skinner as Diana
Lauren Orlando as Kate 
Nadia Turner as Jenna 
Devenity Perkins as Morgan 
Dominic Kline as Brayden 
Darius Marcell as Spencer 
Samuel Parker as Eli 
Paityn Hart as Georgia
Lilia Buckingham as Autumn
Sophia Strauss as herself 
Steffan Argus as Julian 
Logan Pepper as Luca
Lissette

Production
Filming for Total Eclipse takes place in Los Angeles, California.

Series overview

Episodes

Season 1 (2018)

Season 2 (2018)

References

Total Eclipse